The Women's omnium competition at the 2020 UCI Track Cycling World Championships was held on 28 February 2020.

Results

Scratch race
The race was started at 15:00.

Tempo race
The race was started at 16:55.

Elimination race
The race was started at 19.34.

Points race and overall standings
The points race was started at 21:01.

References

Women's omnium
UCI Track Cycling World Championships – Women's omnium